G. nivalis may refer to:
 Galanthus nivalis, a medicinal plant species
 Galeandra nivalis, an orchid species
 Gentiana nivalis, a flowering plant species
 Glechoma nivalis, a mint species